KCHS (1400 AM) is a radio station broadcasting a country music format. Licensed to Truth Or Consequences, New Mexico, United States. The station is currently owned by GPK Media LLC.

References

External links

FCC History Cards for KCHS

CHS
Country radio stations in the United States
Radio stations established in 1988